Emil Janausch (14 February 1901 – 21 May 1960) was an Austrian athlete. He competed in the men's discus throw at the 1932 Summer Olympics and the 1936 Summer Olympics.

References

External links
 

1901 births
1960 deaths
Athletes (track and field) at the 1932 Summer Olympics
Athletes (track and field) at the 1936 Summer Olympics
Austrian male discus throwers
Austrian male hammer throwers
Olympic athletes of Austria
Place of birth missing